The 1971–72 WCHL season was the sixth season of the Western Canada Hockey League. Twelve teams completed a 68-game season, with the Edmonton Oil Kings winning their second consecutive President's Cup.

League notes
The Victoria Cougars joined as an expansion team playing in the West division.
The Vancouver Nats joined as an expansion team playing in the West division.
The Estevan Bruins relocated to New Westminster, British Columbia to become the New Westminster Bruins, playing in the West division.
The Swift Current Broncos and Saskatoon Blades moved to the East division.
The season expanded to 68 games from 66.

Regular season

Final standings

Scoring leaders
Note: GP = Games played; G = Goals; A = Assists; Pts = Points; PIM = Penalties in minutes

1972 WCHL Playoffs

Quarterfinals
Brandon defeated Saskatoon 4 games to 3 with 1 tie
Regina defeated Flin Flon 3 games to 2 with 2 ties
Calgary defeated Medicine Hat 4 games to 2 with 1 tie
Edmonton defeated New Westminster 4 games to 1

Semifinals
Regina defeated Brandon 4 games to 2
Edmonton defeated Calgary 4 games to 2

Finals
Edmonton defeated Regina 4 games to 1

All-Star game

The 1971–72 WCHL All-Star Game was held in Vancouver, British Columbia, with the East 
Division All-Stars defeating the West Division All-Stars 4–2 before a crowd of 5,783.

Awards

All-Star Teams

See also
1971 in sports
1972 in sports

References
whl.ca
 2005–06 WHL Guide

Western Hockey League seasons
WCHL